Matthys is a family surname that could refer to:

Surname
 Danny Matthys, Flemish-Belgian visual artist
 Hervé Matthys, Belgian footballer
 Jan Matthys, Dutch religious leader
 Luc Julian Matthys, Belgian-born, Australian Roman Catholic bishop
 Tim Matthys, Belgian footballer
 Victor Matthys, Belgian politician

See also
 Mathys
 Matthijs

Dutch-language surnames
Patronymic surnames